The Pentagon Spy by Franklin W. Dixon is the 61st title of the Hardy Boys Mystery Stories. It was published by Wanderer Books in 1980 and by Grosset & Dunlap in 2005.

Plot summary
Valuable antique weather vanes are being stolen in the Pennsylvania Dutch Country. A Navy employee removes a top secret document from the Pentagon and then goes missing. Fenton Hardy, Frank and Joe's father, is assigned to find the man and the document. The Hardy brothers discover the connection between the two seemingly unrelated cases.

References

External links
 Amazon.com

The Hardy Boys books
1980 American novels
1980 children's books